YBI may refer to,

Black Tickle Airport, the IATA code for the airport in Newfoundland and Labrador, Canada
Yerba Buena Island, an island in San Francisco Bay
Young Boys Inc., a drug cartel
You Blew It!, an emo band from Orlando, Florida